Henry Mervyn may refer to:

Sir Henry Mervyn (died 1646), English MP for Hindon (UK Parliament constituency)
 Henry Mervyn (died 1699), Irish MP for Augher (Parliament of Ireland constituency) and County Tyrone
 Henry Mervyn (died 1748), Irish MP for Augher and County Tyrone (Parliament of Ireland constituency)